Otto Paul Hermann Diels (23 January 1876 – 7 March 1954) was a German chemist. His most notable work was done with Kurt Alder on the Diels–Alder reaction, a method for diene synthesis.   The pair was awarded the Nobel Prize in Chemistry in 1950 for their work.  Their method of synthesizing cyclic organic compounds proved valuable for the manufacture of synthetic rubber and plastic.  He completed his education at the University of Berlin, where he later worked.  Diels was employed at the University of Kiel when he completed his Nobel Prize–winning work, and remained there until he retired in 1945.  Diels was married, with five children.  He died in 1954.

Early life
Diels was born on 23 January 1876 in Hamburg, Germany, and moved with his family to Berlin when he was two years old.  He studied in Berlin at Joachimsthalsches Gymnasium before attending the University of Berlin starting in 1895.  While at university, Diels studied chemistry under Emil Fischer, eventually graduating in 1899.

Professional career

Immediately after graduating from the University of Berlin, he was offered a position with the Institute of Chemistry at the school.  He advanced quickly through the ranks at the school, eventually ending up as Department Head in 1913.  He remained at the University of Berlin until 1915, when he accepted a position at the University of Kiel, where he remained until his retirement in 1945.  It was during his time at Kiel, where he worked with Kurt Alder developing the Diels–Alder reaction, for which they were awarded the Nobel Prize in Chemistry in 1950.  His work with Alder developed a synthetic method which allows the synthesis of unsaturated cyclic compounds.  This work was important in the production of synthetic rubber and plastic compounds.

Personal life
Diels married Paula Geyer in 1909.  The couple had five children together, three sons and two daughters.  Two of his sons were killed in action during World War II.  In his free time, Diels enjoyed reading, music and traveling.  He died on 7 March 1954.

See also
List of chemists

References

External links

Nobel Lecture Description and Importance of the Aromatic Basic Skeleton of the Steroids
Photo of Diels and Alder
  English Translation of Diels and Alder's seminal 1928 German article that won them the Nobel prize. English title: 'Syntheses of the hydroaromatic series'; German title "Synthesen in der hydroaromatischen Reihe".

1876 births
1954 deaths
20th-century German scientists
Academic staff of the Humboldt University of Berlin
Academic staff of the University of Kiel
Scientists from Berlin
Nobel laureates in Chemistry
German Nobel laureates
Organic chemists
Commanders Crosses of the Order of Merit of the Federal Republic of Germany
Joachimsthalsches Gymnasium alumni